Marco Savelli (born 6 August 1949) is an Italian former sailor. He competed in the Flying Dutchman event at the 1980 Summer Olympics.

References

External links
 

1949 births
Living people
Italian male sailors (sport)
Olympic sailors of Italy
Sailors at the 1980 Summer Olympics – Flying Dutchman
People from Poggibonsi
Sportspeople from the Province of Siena